The 1989 Porsche Tennis Grand Prix was a women's tennis tournament played on indoor carpet courts at the Filderstadt Tennis Centre in Filderstadt, West Germany and was part of the Category 4 tier of the 1989 WTA Tour. It was the 12th edition of the tournament and was held from 9 October to 15 October 1989. First-seeded Gabriela Sabatini won the singles title.

Finals

Singles
 Gabriela Sabatini defeated  Mary Joe Fernández 7–6(7–5), 6–4
 It was Sabatini's 4th singles title of the year and the 13th of her career.

Doubles
 Gigi Fernández /  Robin White defeated  Raffaella Reggi /  Elna Reinach 6–4, 7–6(6–2)

Prize money

References

External links
 Official website 
 ITF tournament edition details

Porsche Tennis Grand Prix
Porsche Tennis Grand Prix
Porsche Tennis Grand Prix
Porsche Tennis Grand Prix
1980s in Baden-Württemberg
Porsch